Leerdammer is a Dutch semihard cheese made from cow's milk. It has an ageing time around 3–12 months. It has a creamy white texture and was made to be similar in appearance and flavor to Emmental. Its sweet and somewhat nutty flavour becomes more pronounced with age. It also has distinct holes. Advertisement campaigns have used the slogan "De lekkerste kaas tussen de gaten" ("the taste is around the holes").

The cheese is produced exclusively by the Groupe Bel. The Leerdammer name is a trademark of Bel Leerdammer B.V. On 22 March 2021, Groupe Bel announced it was handing over the brand and its related assets to Lactalis in exchange for the shares Lactalis held in Groupe Bel, bar a retained 0.9% stake.

Leerdammer cheese is produced in Schoonrewoerd in the municipality of Leerdam, the city which gave Leerdammer its name. Generic Leerdammer-style cheese is sold as Maasdam cheese. Groupe Bel has a second factory producing Leerdammer in Dalfsen, in the eastern province of Overijssel. It is also produced in France.

The cheese was developed by Cees Boterkooper, who had owned a small dairy in Schoonrewoerd since 1914, and Bastiaan Baars, who ran a cheese shop in a nearby village.  The two met in 1970, and soon afterwards decided to collaborate.  They worked on a cheese that could compete with Gouda and Edam. Leerdammer was launched in 1977.
It is also available in supermarkets throughout Europe, Russia, and the US.

See also
Jarlsberg cheese
 List of cheeses

References

External links
 Dutch Leerdammer Site
 itscheese.com Leerdammer page

Dutch cheeses
Cow's-milk cheeses
Cheese with eyes